Liesbeth Homans (born 17 February 1973 in Antwerp) is a Belgian politician and is affiliated to Nieuw-Vlaamse Alliantie (N-VA, New Flemish Alliance). She was elected as a member of the Flemish Parliament in 2009 and as a member of the Belgian Senate in 2010.

She was chairwoman of the Openbaar centrum voor maatschappelijk welzijn (Public Centre for Social Welfare) in Antwerp from 2013 until July 2014, when she became a member of the Bourgeois Government as Flemish Minister for Local Government, Poverty Reduction, Housing, Civic Integration, Equal Opportunities, Cities and Social Economy.

In July 2019 she became the first female Minister-President of Flanders in succession of Geert Bourgeois as he became member of the European parliament. The Homans Government was however only an intermediate government in attendance of a new Flemish government and was replaced in October 2019 by the Jambon Government. On 2 October 2019 she became Speaker of the Flemish Parliament.

Controversies
On 2 July 2019, when a picture was being taken following her oath of office, she said "we do not want this rag in the background", in reference to the Belgian flag.

References

External links

Living people
1973 births
Members of the Senate (Belgium)
Ministers-President of Flanders
Members of the Flemish Parliament
New Flemish Alliance politicians
Politicians from Antwerp
KU Leuven alumni
21st-century Belgian women politicians
21st-century Belgian politicians
Women governors and heads of sub-national entities
Women members of the Senate (Belgium)